Upstart Crow is a British sitcom based on the life of William Shakespeare. Written by Ben Elton, it premiered on 9 May 2016 on BBC Two as part of the commemorations of the 400th anniversary of Shakespeare's death. Its title quotes "an upstart Crow, beautified with our feathers", a critique of Shakespeare by his rival Robert Greene in the latter's Groats-Worth of Wit.

The show is set from 1592 (the year of Greene's quotation) onwards. Shakespeare is played by David Mitchell; his wife, Anne Hathaway, is played by Liza Tarbuck; and Greene himself by Mark Heap. Shakespeare's father, John Shakespeare is played by Harry Enfield. The first series was directed by Matt Lipsey, with subsequent series being directed by Richard Boden.

Synopsis 

The first series follows the writing and preparation to stage Romeo and Juliet after William has gained some early career recognition for his poetry, as well as his plays Henry VI and Richard III. Events in each episode allude to one or more Shakespeare plays and usually end with Will discussing the events with Anne and either being inspired to use, or dissuaded from using, them in a future work. Along with the many Shakespearean references (including the use of asides and soliloquies) there are also several references to the television shows Blackadder and The Office. There are running gags in many episodes: the casual sexism towards Kate's attempts to become an actress, Shakespeare's coach journeys between London and Stratford which refer to modern motorway and railway journey frustrations, and are delivered in a style that references the 1970s sitcom The Fall and Rise of Reginald Perrin, Shakespeare (and in one episode Marlowe) demanding ale and pie from his servants or family, and Shakespeare frequently claiming credit for common turns-of-phrase that predate Elizabethan times (many of them now commonly misattributed to Shakespeare).

The second and third six-episode series were broadcast in 2017 and 2018, as well as two Christmas Day specials.

A 2020 Christmas special, "Lockdown Christmas 1603", depicted William and Kate during the plague of 1603, making references to the COVID-19 pandemic lockdowns in Britain during the year of broadcast.

Stage play

In September 2019, a stage play adaptation  was announced for the Gielgud Theatre, City of Westminster, also written by Elton and with Mitchell and several others reprising their roles. The play opened on 7 February 2020 under the title The Upstart Crow: Elton commented that it was "an entirely original excursion, not a 'TV adaptation' ". The play reopened in the West End at the Apollo Theatre for a ten-week season from 23 September until 3 December 2022, with Mitchell and Whelan reprising the roles of William Shakespeare and Kate.

Series overview

Cast

Guest stars

Music 
The theme music is a 17th-century English country dance tune called "Jamaica". This was first published in the 1670 4th Edition of John Playford's The Dancing Master, after Shakespeare's death.

Reception
Upstart Crow was positively received by critics.

See also
 All Is True, another piece about Shakespeare written by Ben Elton.
 Greene's Groats-Worth of Wit - 1592 pamphlet, source of the phrase "upstart crow"

References

External links 
 
 
 
 
 Only snobbish, elitist Britain could say that Shakespeare didn’t write his own plays Ben Elton on the show's historical background. Radio Times

400th anniversary of Shakespeare's death
2016 British television series debuts
2010s British sitcoms
2020s British sitcoms
BBC high definition shows
BBC television sitcoms
Cultural depictions of William Shakespeare
English-language television shows
Television shows set in London
Television shows written by Ben Elton
Television series about families
Television series about marriage
Television set in Tudor England
Television series created by Ben Elton